Nafamostat mesylate (INN), a synthetic serine protease inhibitor, it is a short-acting anticoagulant, and is also used for the treatment of pancreatitis. It also has some potential antiviral and anti-cancer properties. Nafamostat is a fast-acting proteolytic inhibitor and used during hemodialysis to prevent the proteolysis of fibrinogen into fibrin.  The mechanism of action of Nafamostat is as a slow tight-binding substrate, trapping the target protein in the acyl-enzyme intermediate form, resulting in apparent observed inhibition. 

It inhibits a large number of Lys/Arg specific serine proteinases, and is also a tryptase inhibitor, which is implicated in leaking blood vessels which is symptomatic of dengue hemorrhagic fever and of end-stage dengue shock syndrome.  It is available in a generic form already used for the treatment of certain bleeding complications in some countries, there are risks of severe complications such as: agranulocytosis,  hyperkalemia, and anaphylaxis which must be weighed in non-emergency care. In some countries, it used as a treatment for pancreatitis and pancreatic cancer.

This drug has been identified as a potential therapy for COVID-19, with clinical trials in Japan possibly set to begin in March 2020. With evidence that Nafamostat is a potent anti-viral inhibitor in lung cells, a second round of clinical trials in Korea has begun with 10 hospitals participating.

Multiple Phase 2/3
and Phase 3 clinical trials for COVID-19 in different countries are ongoing.

References 

Anticoagulants
Serine protease inhibitors